Injury is damage to the body.

Injury may also refer to:

Injury (law)
Injury (sports)
Injury (journal), a peer-reviewed medical journal covering trauma care
"The Injury", an episode of The Office

See also